Wikipedia began with its first edit on 15 January 2001, two days after the domain was registered by Jimmy Wales and Larry Sanger. Its technological and conceptual underpinnings predate this; the earliest known proposal for an online encyclopedia was made by Rick Gates in 1993, and the concept of a free-as-in-freedom online encyclopedia (as distinct from mere open source) was proposed by Richard Stallman in 1998.

Crucially, Stallman's concept specifically included the idea that no central organization should control editing. This characteristic greatly contrasted with contemporary digital encyclopedias such as Microsoft Encarta, Encyclopædia Britannica, and even Bomis's Nupedia, which was Wikipedia's direct predecessor. In 2001, the license for Nupedia was changed to GFDL, and Wales and Sanger launched Wikipedia using the concept and technology of a wiki pioneered in 1995 by Ward Cunningham. Initially, Wikipedia was intended to complement Nupedia, an online encyclopedia project edited solely by experts, by providing additional draft articles and ideas for it. In practice, Wikipedia quickly overtook Nupedia, becoming a global project in multiple languages and inspiring a wide range of other online reference projects.

Wikipedia's worldwide monthly readership in 2014 was approximately 495 million. Worldwide in September 2018, WMF Labs tallied 15.5 billion page views for the month. According to comScore, Wikipedia receives over 117 million monthly unique visitors from the United States alone.

Historical overview

Background
The concept of compiling the world's knowledge in a single location dates back to the ancient Library of Alexandria and Library of Pergamum, but the modern concept of a general-purpose, widely distributed, printed encyclopedia originated with Denis Diderot and the 18th-century French encyclopedists. The idea of using automated machinery beyond the printing press to build a more useful encyclopedia can be traced to Paul Otlet's 1934 book Traité de Documentation; Otlet also founded the Mundaneum, an institution dedicated to indexing the world's knowledge, in 1910. This concept of a machine-assisted encyclopedia was further expanded in H. G. Wells' book of essays World Brain (1938) and Vannevar Bush's future vision of the microfilm-based Memex in his essay "As We May Think" (1945). Another milestone was Ted Nelson's hypertext design Project Xanadu, which was begun in 1960.

The use of volunteers was integral and instrumental in creating and maintaining Wikipedia. However, even without the internet, huge complex projects of similar nature had made use of volunteers. Specifically, the creation of the Oxford English Dictionary was conceived with the speech at the London Library, on Guy Fawkes Day, 5 November 1857 by Richard Chenevix Trench. It took about 70 years to complete. Dr. Trench envisioned a grand new dictionary of every word in the English language, and to be used democratically and freely. According to author Simon Winchester, "The undertaking of the scheme, he said, was beyond the ability of any one man. To peruse all of English literature—and to comb the London and New York newspapers and the most literate of the magazines and journals—must be instead 'the combined action of many.' It would be necessary to recruit a team—moreover, a huge one—probably comprising hundreds and hundreds of unpaid amateurs, all of them working as volunteers."

Advances in information technology in the late 20th century led to changes in the form of encyclopedias. While previous encyclopedias, notably the Encyclopædia Britannica, were often book-based, Microsoft's Encarta, published in 1993, was available on CD-ROM and hyperlinked. The development of the World Wide Web led to many attempts to develop internet encyclopedia projects. An early proposal for an online encyclopedia was Interpedia in 1993 by Rick Gates; this project died before generating any encyclopedic content. Free software proponent Richard Stallman described the usefulness of a "Free Universal Encyclopedia and Learning Resource" in 1998. His published document outlined how to "ensure that progress continues towards this best and most natural outcome." On Wednesday 17 January 2001, two days after the founding of Wikipedia, the Free Software Foundation's (FSF) GNUPedia project went online, competing with Nupedia, but today the FSF encourages people "to visit and contribute to [Wikipedia]".

Wikipedia co-founder Jimmy Wales has stated that the germ of the concept for Wikipedia, for him, came back when he was a graduate student at Indiana University where he was impressed with the successes of the open-source movement and found Richard Stallman's Emacs Manifesto promoting free software and a sharing economy to be quite interesting. At the time, Wales was studying finance and was intrigued by the incentives of the many people who contributed as volunteers toward creating free software where there were many examples having excellent results.

According to The Economist, Wikipedia "has its roots in the techno-optimism that characterised the internet at the end of the 20th century. It held that ordinary people could use their computers as tools for liberation, education, and enlightenment."

Formulation of the concept
Wikipedia was initially conceived as a feeder project for the Wales-founded Nupedia, an earlier project to produce a free online encyclopedia, volunteered by Bomis, a web-advertising firm owned by Jimmy Wales, Tim Shell and Michael E. Davis. Nupedia was founded upon the use of highly qualified volunteer contributors and an elaborate multi-step peer review process. Despite its mailing list of interested editors, and the presence of a full-time editor-in-chief, Larry Sanger, a graduate philosophy student hired by Wales, the writing of content for Nupedia was extremely slow, with only 12 articles written during the first year.

Wales and Sanger discussed various ways to create content more rapidly. The idea of a wiki-based complement originated from a conversation between Sanger and Ben Kovitz. Ben Kovitz was a computer programmer and regular on Ward Cunningham's revolutionary wiki "the WikiWikiWeb". He explained to Sanger what wikis were, at that time a difficult concept to understand, over a dinner on Tuesday 2 January 2001. Wales first stated, in October 2001, that "Larry had the idea to use Wiki software", though he later stated in December 2005 that Jeremy Rosenfeld, a Bomis employee, introduced him to the concept. Sanger thought a wiki would be a good platform to use, and proposed on the Nupedia mailing list that a wiki based upon UseModWiki (then v. 0.90) be set up as a "feeder" project for Nupedia. Under the subject "Let's make a wiki", he wrote:

Wales set one up and put it online on Wednesday 10 January 2001.

Founding of Wikipedia

There was considerable resistance on the part of Nupedia's editors and reviewers to the idea of associating Nupedia with a wiki-style website. In his message to Nupedia mailing list sent on 11 January 2001, Sanger suggested giving the new project its own name, Wikipedia, and Wikipedia was soon launched on its own domain, on Monday 15 January 2001. The bandwidth and server (located in San Diego) used for these initial projects were donated by Bomis. Many former Bomis employees later contributed content to the encyclopedia: notably Tim Shell, co-founder and later CEO of Bomis, and programmer Jason Richey.

Wales stated in December 2008 that he made Wikipedia's first edit, a test edit with the text "Hello, World!", but this edit may have been to an old version of Wikipedia which soon after was scrapped and replaced by a restart. The existence of the project was formally announced and an appeal for volunteers to engage in content creation was made to the Nupedia mailing list on 17 January 2001.

The project received many new participants after being mentioned on the Slashdot website in July 2001, having already earned two minor mentions in March 2001. It then received a prominent pointer to a story on the community-edited technology and culture website Kuro5hin on 25 July. Between these relatively rapid influxes of traffic, there had been a steady stream of traffic from other sources, especially Google, which alone sent hundreds of new visitors to the site every day. It's first major mainstream media coverage was in The New York Times on 20 September 2001.

The project gained its 1,000th article around Monday 12 February 2001 and reached 10,000 articles around 7 September. In the first year of its existence, over 20,000 encyclopedia entries were created – a rate of over 1,500 articles per month. On Friday 30 August 2002, the article count reached 40,000.

Wikipedia's earliest edits were long believed lost, since the original UseModWiki software deleted old data after about a month. On Tuesday 14 December 2010, developer Tim Starling found backups on SourceForge containing every change made to Wikipedia from its creation in January 2001 to 17 August 2001. It showed the first edit as being to HomePage on 15 January 2001, reading "This is the new WikiPedia!". That edit was imported in 2019 and can be found here.

The first three edits that were known of before Tim Starling's discovery, are:
To page Wikipedia:UuU at 20:08, 16 January 2001
To page TransporT at 20:12, 16 January 2001
To page User:ScottMoonen at 21:16, 16 January 2001

Divisions and internationalization 
Early in Wikipedia's development, it began to expand internationally, with the creation of new namespaces, each with a distinct set of usernames. For about two months Catalan was the one with the most articles in a non-English language, although statistics of that early period are imprecise. The French Wikipedia was created on or around 11 May 2001, in a wave of new language versions that also included Chinese, Dutch, Esperanto, Hebrew, Italian, Portuguese, Russian, Spanish, and Swedish. These languages were soon joined by Arabic and Hungarian. In September 2001, an announcement pledged commitment to the multilingual provision of Wikipedia, notifying users of an upcoming roll-out of Wikipedias for all major languages, the establishment of core standards, and a push for the translation of core pages for the new wikis. At the end of that year, when international statistics first began to be logged, Afrikaans, Norwegian, and Serbian versions were announced.

In January 2002, 90% of all Wikipedia articles were in English. By January 2004, fewer than 50% were English, and this internationalization has continued to increase as the encyclopedia grows. , about 85.5% of all Wikipedia articles are contained within non-English Wikipedia versions.

Development of Wikipedia

In March 2002, following the withdrawal of funding by Bomis during the dot-com bust, Larry Sanger left both Nupedia and Wikipedia. By 2002, Sanger and Wales differed in their views on how best to manage open encyclopedias. Both still supported the open-collaboration concept, but the two disagreed on how to handle disruptive editors, specific roles for experts, and the best way to guide the project to success.

Wales went on to establish self-governance and bottom-up self-direction by editors on Wikipedia. He made it clear that he would not be involved in the community's day-to-day management, but would encourage it to learn to self-manage and find its own best approaches. , Wales mostly restricts his own role to occasional input on serious matters, executive activity, advocacy of knowledge, and encouragement of similar reference projects.

Sanger says he is an "inclusionist" and is open to almost anything. He proposed that experts still have a place in the Web 2.0 world. He returned briefly to academia, then joined the Digital Universe Foundation. In 2006, Sanger founded Citizendium, an open encyclopedia that used real names for contributors in an effort to reduce disruptive editing, and hoped to facilitate "gentle expert guidance" to increase the accuracy of its content. Decisions about article content were to be up to the community, but the site was to include a statement about "family-friendly content". He stated early on that he intended to leave Citizendium in a few years, by which time the project and its management would presumably be established.

Past content of Wikipedia 
Old, even obsolete, encyclopedia articles are highly valuable for historical research. For each Wikipedia article, past versions are accessible through the "View history" link at the top of the page. In addition, ZIM File Archive, at Internet Archive, contains past snapshots of full Wikipedia, as well as articles selections, in multiple languages, from different years. They can be opened with Kiwix software.

Between 2007 and 2011, three CD/DVD versions (called Wikipedia Version 0.5, 0.7 and 0.8) containing a selection of articles from English Wikipedia were released. They are now available as Kiwix ZIM files, both from ZIM File Archive, and from Kiwix download site.

Evolution of logo

Timeline

First decade: 2000–2009

2000

In March 2000, the Nupedia project was started. Its intention was to publish articles written by experts which would be licensed as free content. Nupedia was founded by Jimmy Wales, with Larry Sanger as editor-in-chief, and funded by the web-advertising company Bomis.

2001
In January 2001, Wikipedia began as a side-project of Nupedia, to allow collaboration on articles prior to entering the peer-review process. The name was suggested by Sanger on 11 January 2001 as a portmanteau of the words wiki (Hawaiian for "quick") and encyclopedia. The wikipedia.com and wikipedia.org domain names were registered on 12 and 13 January, respectively, with wikipedia.org being brought online on the same day. The project formally opened on 15 January ("Wikipedia Day"), with the first international Wikipedias – the French, German, Catalan, Swedish, and Italian editions – being created between March and May. The "neutral point of view" (NPOV) policy was officially formulated at this time, and Wikipedia's first slashdotter wave arrived on 26 July. The first media report about Wikipedia appeared in August 2001 in the newspaper Wales on Sunday.

The September 11 attacks spurred the appearance of breaking news stories on the homepage, as well as information boxes linking related articles. At the time, approximately 100 articles related to 9/11 had been created. After the 11 September attacks, a link to the Wikipedia article on the attacks appeared on Yahoo!'s home page, resulting in a spike in traffic.

2002
2002 saw the end of funding for Wikipedia from Bomis and the departure of Larry Sanger. The forking of the Spanish Wikipedia also took place with the establishment of the Enciclopedia Libre. The first portable MediaWiki software went live on 25 January. Bots was introduced, Jimmy Wales confirmed that Wikipedia would never run commercial advertising, and the first sister project (Wiktionary) and first formal Manual of Style were launched. A separate board of directors to supervise the project was proposed and initially discussed at Meta-Wikipedia. Close to 200 contributors were editing Wikipedia daily.

2003
The English Wikipedia passed 100,000 articles in 2003, while the next largest edition, the German Wikipedia, passed 10,000. The Wikimedia Foundation was established, and Wikipedia adopted its jigsaw world logo. Mathematical formulae using TeX were reintroduced to the website. The first Wikipedian social meeting took place in Munich, Germany, in October. The basic principles of Wikipedia's  (known colloquially as "ArbCom") were developed.

Wikisource was created as a separate project on 24 November 2003, to host free textual sources.

2004
The worldwide Wikipedia article pool continued to grow rapidly in 2004, doubling in size in 12 months, from under 500,000 articles in late 2003 to over 1 million in over 100 languages by the end of 2004. The English Wikipedia accounted for just under half of these articles. The website's server farms were moved from California to Florida,  and CSS style configuration sheets were introduced, and the first attempt to block Wikipedia occurred, with the website being blocked in China for two weeks in June. The formal election of a board and Arbitration Committee began. The first formal projects were proposed to deliberately balance content and seek out systemic bias arising from Wikipedia's community structure.

Bourgeois v. Peters, (11th Cir. 2004), a court case decided by the United States Court of Appeals for the Eleventh Circuit was one of the earliest court opinions to cite and quote Wikipedia. It stated: "We also reject the notion that the Department of Homeland Security's threat advisory level somehow justifies these searches. Although the threat level was 'elevated' at the time of the protest, 'to date, the threat level has stood at yellow (elevated) for the majority of its time in existence. It has been raised to orange (high) six times."

Wikimedia Commons was created on 7 September 2004 to host media files for Wikipedia in all languages.

2005
In 2005, Wikipedia became the most popular reference website on the Internet, according to Hitwise, with English Wikipedia alone exceeding 750,000 articles. Wikipedia's first multilingual and subject portals were established in 2005. A formal fundraiser held in the first quarter of the year raised almost US$100,000 for system upgrades to handle growing demand. China again blocked Wikipedia in October 2005.

The first major Wikipedia scandal, the Seigenthaler incident, occurred in 2005 when a well-known figure was found to have a vandalized biography that had gone unnoticed for months. In the wake of this and other concerns, the first policy and system changes specifically designed to counter this form of abuse were established. These included a new Checkuser privilege policy update to assist in sock puppetry investigations, a new feature called , a more strict policy on biographies of living people and the tagging of such articles for stricter review. A restriction of new article creation to registered users only was put in place in December 2005, after the Seigenthaler incident where an anonymous user posted a hoax.

Wikimania 2005, the first Wikimania conference, was held from 4 to 8 August 2005 at the Haus der Jugend in Frankfurt, Germany, attracting about 380 attendees.

2006
The English Wikipedia gained its one-millionth article, Jordanhill railway station, on 1 March 2006. The first approved Wikipedia article selection was made freely available to download, and "Wikipedia" became registered as a trademark of the Wikimedia Foundation. The congressional aides biography scandals – multiple incidents in which congressional staffers and a campaign manager were caught trying to covertly alter Wikipedia biographies – came to public attention, leading to the resignation of the campaign manager. Nonetheless, Wikipedia was rated as one of the top five global brands of 2006.

Jimmy Wales indicated at Wikimania 2006 that Wikipedia had achieved sufficient volume and called for an emphasis on quality, perhaps best expressed in the call for 100,000 feature-quality articles. A new privilege, "oversight", was created, allowing specific versions of archived pages with unacceptable content to be marked as non-viewable. Semi-protection against anonymous vandalism, introduced in 2005, proved more popular than expected, with over 1,000 pages being semi-protected at any given time in 2006.

2007
Wikipedia continued to grow rapidly in 2007, possessing over 5 million registered editor accounts by 13 August. The 250 language editions of Wikipedia contained a combined total of 7.5 million articles, totalling 1.74 billion words, by 13 August. The English Wikipedia gained articles at a steady rate of 1,700 a day, with the wikipedia.org domain name ranked the 10th-busiest in the world. Wikipedia continued to garner visibility in the press – the Essjay controversy broke out when a prominent member of Wikipedia was found to have lied about his credentials. Citizendium, a competing online encyclopedia, launched publicly. A new trend developed in Wikipedia, with the encyclopedia addressing people whose notability stemmed from being a participant in a news story by adding a redirect from their name to the larger story, rather than creating a distinct biographical article. On 9 September 2007, the English Wikipedia gained its two-millionth article, El Hormiguero. There was some controversy in late 2007 when the Volapük Wikipedia jumped from 797 to over 112,000 articles, briefly becoming the 15th-largest Wikipedia edition, due to automated stub generation by an enthusiast for the Volapük constructed language.

According to the MIT Technology Review, the number of regularly active editors on the English-language Wikipedia peaked in 2007 at more than 51,000, and has since been declining.

In April 2007, Wikipedia Version 0.5 article selection release was published.

2008
Various  in many areas continued to expand and refine article contents within their scope. In April 2008, the 10-millionth Wikipedia article was created, and by the end of the year the English Wikipedia exceeded 2.5 million articles.

2009
On 25 June 2009 at 3:15 pm PDT (22:15 UTC), following the death of pop icon Michael Jackson, the website temporarily crashed.

The Wikimedia Foundation reported nearly a million visitors to Jackson's biography within one hour, probably the most visitors in a one-hour period to any article in Wikipedia's history. By late August 2009, the number of articles in all Wikipedia editions had exceeded 14 million. The three-millionth article on the English Wikipedia, Beate Eriksen, was created on 17 August 2009 at 04:05 UTC. On 27 December 2009, the German Wikipedia exceeded one million articles, becoming the second edition after the English Wikipedia to do so. A TIME article listed Wikipedia among 2009's best websites.

Wikipedia content became licensed under a Creative Commons Attribution-ShareAlike license in 2009.

Second decade: 2010–2019

2010
On 24 March, the European Wikipedia servers went offline due to an overheating problem. Failover to servers in Florida turned out to be broken, causing DNS resolution for Wikipedia to fail across the world. The problem was resolved quickly, but due to DNS caching effects, some areas were slower to regain access to Wikipedia than others.

On 13 May, the site released a new interface. New features included an updated logo, new navigation tools, and a link wizard. However, the classic interface remained available for those who wished to use it. On 12 December, the English Wikipedia passed the 3.5-million-article mark, while the French Wikipedia's millionth article was created on 21 September. The 1-billionth Wikimedia project edit was performed on 16 April.

In early 2010, Wikipedia Version 0.7 article selection release was published.

2011

Wikipedia and its users held many celebrations worldwide to commemorate the site's 10th anniversary on 15 January. The site began efforts to expand its growth in India, holding its first Indian conference in Mumbai in November 2011. The English Wikipedia passed the 3.6-million-article mark on 2 April, and reached 3.8 million articles on 18 November. On 7 November 2011, the German Wikipedia exceeded 100 million page edits, becoming the second language edition to do so after the English edition, which attained 500 million page edits on 24 November 2011. The Dutch Wikipedia exceeded 1 million articles on 17 December 2011, becoming the fourth Wikipedia edition to do so.

On 3 March 2011, Wikipedia Version 0.8 article selection release was published.

The "Wikimania 2011 – Haifa, Israel" stamp was issued by Israel Post on 2 August 2011. This was the first-ever stamp dedicated to a Wikimedia-related project.

Between 4 and 6 October 2011, the Italian Wikipedia became intentionally inaccessible in protest against the Italian Parliament's proposed DDL intercettazioni law, which, if approved, would allow any person to force websites to remove information that is perceived as untrue or offensive, without the need to provide evidence.

Also in October 2011, Wikimedia announced the launch of Wikipedia Zero, an initiative to enable free mobile access to Wikipedia in developing countries through partnerships with mobile operators.

2012

On 16 January, Wikipedia co-founder Jimmy Wales announced that the English Wikipedia would shut down for 24 hours on 18 January as part of a protest meant to call public attention to the proposed Stop Online Piracy Act and PROTECT IP Act, two anti-piracy laws under debate in the United States Congress. Calling the blackout a "community decision", Wales and other opponents of the laws believed that they would endanger free speech and online innovation. A similar blackout was staged on 10 July by the Russian Wikipedia, in protest against a proposed Russian internet regulation law.

In late March 2012, the Wikimedia Deutschland announced Wikidata, a universal platform for sharing data between all Wikipedia language editions. The US$1.7-million Wikidata project was partly funded by Google, the Gordon and Betty Moore Foundation, and the Allen Institute for Artificial Intelligence. Wikimedia Deutschland assumed responsibility for the first phase of Wikidata, and initially planned to make the platform available to editors by December 2012. Wikidata's first phase became fully operational in March 2013.

In April 2012, Justin Knapp became the first single contributor to make over one million edits to Wikipedia. Jimmy Wales congratulated Knapp for his work and presented him with the site's Special Barnstar medal and the Golden Wiki award for his achievement. Wales also declared that 20 April would be "Justin Knapp Day".

On 13 July 2012, the English Wikipedia gained its 4-millionth article, Izbat al-Burj. In October 2012, historian and Wikipedia editor Richard J. Jensen opined that the English Wikipedia was "nearing completion", noting that the number of regularly active editors had fallen significantly since 2007, despite Wikipedia's rapid growth in article count and readership.

According to Alexa Internet, Wikipedia was the world's sixth-most-popular website as of November 2012. Dow Jones ranked Wikipedia fifth worldwide as of December 2012.

2013
On 22 January 2013, the Italian Wikipedia became the fifth language edition of Wikipedia to exceed 1 million articles, while the Russian and Spanish Wikipedias gained their millionth articles on 11 and 16 May respectively. On 15 July the Swedish and on 24 September the Polish Wikipedias gained their millionth articles, becoming the eighth and ninth Wikipedia editions to do so.

On 27 January, the main belt asteroid 274301 was officially renamed "Wikipedia" by the Committee for Small Body Nomenclature.

The first phase of the Wikidata database, automatically providing interlanguage links and other data, became available for all language editions in March 2013.

In April 2013, the French secret service was accused of attempting to censor Wikipedia by threatening a Wikipedia volunteer with arrest unless "classified information" about a military radio station was deleted.

In July, the VisualEditor editing system was launched, forming the first stage of an effort to allow articles to be edited with a word processor-like interface instead of using wiki markup. An editor specifically designed for smartphones and other mobile devices was also launched.

2014

In February 2014, a project to make a print edition of the English Wikipedia, consisting of 1,000 volumes and over 1,100,000 pages, was launched by German Wikipedia contributors. The project sought funding through Indiegogo, and was intended to honor the contributions of Wikipedia's editors. On 22 October 2014, the first monument to Wikipedia was unveiled in the Polish town of Slubice.

On 8 June 15 June, and 16 July 2014, the Waray Wikipedia, the Vietnamese Wikipedia and the Cebuano Wikipedia each exceeded the one million article mark. They were the tenth, eleventh and twelfth Wikipedias to reach that milestone. Despite having very few active users, the Waray and Cebuano Wikipedias had a high number of automatically generated articles created by bots.

2015

In mid-2015, Wikipedia was the world's seventh-most-popular website according to Alexa Internet, down one place from the position it held in November 2012. At the start of 2015, Wikipedia remained the largest general-knowledge encyclopedia online, with a combined total of over 36 million mainspace articles across all 291 language editions. On average, Wikipedia receives a total of 10 billion global pageviews from around 495 million unique visitors every month, including 85 million visitors from the United States alone, where it is the sixth-most-popular site.

Print Wikipedia was an art project by Michael Mandiberg that created the ability to print 7473 volumes of Wikipedia as it existed on 7 April 2015. Each volume has 700 pages and only 110 were printed by the artist.

On 1 November 2015, the English Wikipedia reached 5,000,000 articles with the creation of an article on Persoonia terminalis, a type of shrub.

2016
On 19 January 2016, the Japanese Wikipedia exceeded the one million article mark, becoming the thirteenth Wikipedia to reach that milestone. The millionth article was 波号第二百二十四潜水艦 (a World War II submarine of the Imperial Japanese Navy).

In mid-2016, Wikipedia was once again the world's sixth-most-popular website according to Alexa Internet, up one place from the position it held in the previous year.

In October 2016, the mobile version of Wikipedia got a new look.

2017
In mid-2017, Wikipedia was listed as the world's fifth-most-popular website according to Alexa Internet, rising one place from the position it held in the previous year. Wikipedia Zero was made available in Iraq and Afghanistan.

On 29 April 2017, online access to Wikipedia was blocked across all language editions in Turkey by the Turkish authorities. This block lasted until 15 January 2020, as the court of Turkey ruled that the block violated human rights. The encrypted Japanese Wikipedia has been blocked in China since 28 December 2017.

2018
During 2018, Wikipedia retained its listing as the world's fifth-most-popular website according to Alexa Internet. One notable development was the use of Artificial Intelligence to create draft articles on overlooked topics.

On 13 April 2018, the number of Chinese Wikipedia articles exceeded 1 million, becoming the fourteenth Wikipedia to reach that milestone. The Chinese Wikipedia has been blocked in Mainland China since May 2015. Later in the year, on 26 June, the Portuguese Wikipedia exceeded the one million article mark, becoming the fifteenth Wikipedia to reach that milestone. The millionth article was Perdão de Richard Nixon (the Pardon of Richard Nixon).

2019
In August 2019, according to Alexa.com, Wikipedia fell from fifth-placed to seventh-placed website in the world for global internet engagement.

On 23 April 2019, Chinese authorities expanded the block of Wikipedia to versions in all languages. The timing of the block coincided with the 30th anniversary of the 1989 Tiananmen Square protests and massacre and the 100th anniversary of the May Fourth Movement, resulting in stricter internet censorship in China.

Third decade: 2020–present

2020

On 23 January 2020, the six millionth article, the biography of Maria Elise Turner Lauder, was added to the English Wikipedia. Despite this growth in articles, Wikipedia's global internet engagement, as measured by Alexa, continued to decline. By February 2020, Wikipedia fell to the eleventh-placed website in the world for global internet engagement. Both Wikipedia's coverage of the COVID-19 pandemic crisis and the supporting edits, discussions, and even deletions were thought to be a useful resource for future historians seeking to understand the period in detail. The World Health Organization collaborated with Wikipedia as a key resource for the dissemination of COVID-19-related information as to help combat the spread of misinformation.

2021
In January 2021, Wikipedia's 20th anniversary was noted in the media.

On 13 January 2021, the English Wikipedia reached one billion edits, where the billionth edit was made by Steven Pruitt.

MIT Press published an open access book of essays Wikipedia @ 20: Stories of an Unfinished Revolution, edited by Joseph Reagle and Jackie Koerner with contributions from prominent Wikipedians, Wikimedians, researchers, journalists, librarians and other experts reflecting on particular histories and themes.

By November 2021, Wikipedia had fallen to the thirteenth-placed website in the world for global internet engagement.

2022 
On 6 December 2022, Wikipedian Richard Knipel created the article Artwork title, whose first revision was a draft generated by ChatGPT that Knipel had made minor edits to more closely conform with Wikipedia standards. Knipel stated on a talk page that he believed this was the first time anyone had used ChatGPT to compose a Wikipedia article. The posting of this article was criticized by other editors and sparked controversy within the Wikipedia community, leading to an extensive debate about whether ChatGPT and similar models should be used in writing content for Wikipedia and, if so, to what extent.

2023
In January 2023, the default Wikipedia desktop interface was changed for the first time since 2010, to Vector 2022.

History by subject area

Hardware and software

The software that runs Wikipedia, and the computer hardware, server farms and other systems upon which Wikipedia relies.
 In January 2001, Wikipedia ran on UseModWiki, written in Perl by Clifford Adams. The server still runs on Linux, although the original text was stored in files rather than in a database. Articles were named with the CamelCase convention.
 In January 2002, "Phase II" of the wiki software powering Wikipedia was introduced, replacing the older UseModWiki. Written specifically for the project by Magnus Manske, it included a PHP wiki engine.
 In July 2002, a major rewrite of the software powering Wikipedia went live; dubbed "Phase III", it replaced the older "Phase II" version, and became MediaWiki. It was written by Lee Daniel Crocker in response to the increasing demands of the growing project.
 In October 2002, Derek Ramsey created a bot—an automated program called Rambot—to add a large number of articles about United States towns; these articles were automatically generated from U.S. census data. He thus increased the number of Wikipedia articles by 33,832. This has been called "the most controversial move in Wikipedia history".
 In January 2003, support for mathematical formulas in TeX was added. The code was contributed by Tomasz Wegrzanowski.
 On 9 June 2003, Wikipedia's ISBN interface was amended to make ISBNs in articles link to Special:Booksources, which fetches its contents from the user-editable page . Before this, ISBN link targets were coded into the software and new ones were suggested on the  page. See the edit that changed this.
 After 6 December 2003, various system messages shown to Wikipedia users were no longer hard coded, allowing Wikipedia  to modify certain parts of MediaWiki's interface, such as the message shown to blocked users.
 On 12 February 2004, server operations were moved from San Diego, California to Tampa, Florida.
 On 29 May 2004, all the various websites were updated to a new version of the MediaWiki software.
 On 30 May 2004, the first instances of "categorization" entries appeared. Category schemes, like Recent Changes and Edit This Page, had existed since the founding of Wikipedia. However, Larry Sanger had viewed the schemes as lists, and even hand-entered articles, whereas the categorization effort centered on individual categorization entries in each article of the encyclopedia, as part of a larger automatic categorization of the articles of the encyclopedia.
 After 3 June 2004, administrators could edit the style of the interface by changing the CSS in the monobook stylesheet at MediaWiki:Monobook.css.
 Also on 30 May 2004, with MediaWiki 1.3, the Template namespace was created, allowing transclusion of standard texts.
 On 7 June 2005 at 3:00 a.m. Eastern Standard Time, the bulk of the Wikimedia servers were moved to a new facility across the street. All Wikimedia projects were down during this time.
 In March 2013, the first phase of the Wikidata interwiki database became available across Wikipedia's language editions.
 In July 2013, the VisualEditor editing interface was inaugurated, allowing users to edit Wikipedia using a WYSIWYG text editor (similar to a word processor) instead of wiki markup. An editing interface optimised for mobile devices was also released.

Look and feel
The external face of Wikipedia, its look and feel, and the Wikipedia branding, as presented to users.
 On 4 April 2002, BrilliantProse, since renamed Featured Articles, was moved to the Wikipedia namespace from the article namespace.
 Around 15 October 2003, a new Wikipedia logo was installed. The logo concept was selected by a voting process, which was followed by a revision process to select the best variant. The final selection was created by David Friedland (who edits Wikipedia under the username "nohat") based on a logo design and concept created by Paul Stansifer.
 On 22 February 2004, Did You Know (DYK) made  its first Main Page appearance.
 On 23 February 2004, a coordinated new look for the Main Page appeared at 19:46 UTC. Hand-chosen entries for the Daily Featured Article, Anniversaries, In the News, and Did You Know rounded out the new look.
 On 10 January 2005, the multilingual portal at www.wikipedia.org was set up, replacing a redirect to the English-language Wikipedia.
 On 5 February 2005,  was created, becoming the first thematic "portal" on the English Wikipedia. However, the concept was pioneered on the German Wikipedia, where Portal:Recht (law studies) was set up in October 2003.
 On 16 July 2005, the English Wikipedia began the practice of including the day's "featured pictures" on the Main Page.
 On 19 March 2006, following a vote, the Main Page of the English-language Wikipedia featured its first redesign in nearly two years.
 On 13 May 2010, the site released a new interface. New features included an updated logo, new navigation tools, and a link wizard. The "classic" Wikipedia interface remained available as an option.

Layout changes in 2023 

Vector 2022, an update to Wikipedia's previous skin Vector 2010, was announced in September 2020, and initially slated for debut in 2021, before being ultimately deployed in January 2023. It is now the default skin on the desktop in over 300 of its language editions and some sister projects.

Vector 2022 features a revised user interface which makes numerous changes to the arrangement of the interface elements. Among them, the language selection menu, previously located to the left of the screen, now is found in the top right corner of the display of the article that is currently read. Additionally, the sidebar is collapsible behind a hamburger button. Vector 2022 additionally increases the margins of the article display, which has the effect of limiting the width of the article; a toggle exists which can decrease the margins and expand the line width of the article to fill the screen. The default size of the text has not been increased, although the Wikimedia Foundation told Engadget that they hope to make this an option in future. The search function was also updated in Vector 2022, as the suggested results in response to user queries now include images and short descriptions from the pages in question.

The Wikimedia Foundation said that the change was motivated by a desire to modernize the site and improve the navigation and editing experience for readers inexperienced with the internet, as the previous skin was deemed "clunky and overwhelming." Tests conducted by the foundation yielded results of a 30 percent increase in user searches, and a 15 percent decrease in scrolling. Early versions of Vector 2022 first went live in 2020 on the French-, Hebrew-, and Portuguese-language Wikipedia sites, as the skin's new features were rolled out to users for testing gradually before its full release. The skin went live as the default skin for readers of Wikimedia sites in 300 (out of 318) languages on 18 January 2023.

Following the mass rollout of Vector 2022, it is still possible to read Wikipedia using the previous skin. However, to do so requires readers to register for a Wikipedia account, and then set their preferences to display Vector 2010 instead. No changes were made to existing Wikipedia skins such as Monobook and Timeless, which also remain available to use.

Wikipedia users were divided on the changes. A request for comment on the English Wikipedia asking the community whether or not Vector 2022 should be deployed as the default skin accumulated over 90,000 words in responses. Critics of the redesign objected most prominently to the white space left empty in the new skin, while other users criticized said critics as having a kneejerk resistance to change. 165 editors participating in the discussion disapproved of the new skin, while 153 were in favor, and nine remained neutral. Despite the larger number of editors who expressed that they did not want Vector 2022 to be deployed in its then-current form, as consensus on Wikipedia is not decided by vote, the discussion was closed in favor of the redesign, considering the positive comments left by other users. The Vector 2022 developers made some changes to the skin in response to the criticisms, such as adding a toggle to enable article content to fill the entire width of the screen. Users on the Swahili Wikipedia unanimously disagreed with the enactment of the new skin.

Journalists responding to Vector 2022's rollout considered the update and the new features introduced as useful additions, but generally characterized the skin as a minor update that did not fundamentally change their reading experience on Wikipedia. Annie Rauwerda, creator of the Depths of Wikipedia social media accounts, wrote in Slate that Vector 2022 was not "dramatically different" from the previous skin. Rauwerda additionally noted the similarity between the Wikipedia community backlash against the design and previous resistances to similar visual changes on popular sites such as Reddit. Rauwerda, and Mike Pearl of Mashable, commented that users displeased with the change could weigh in on a discussion about the skin, or use the site's built-in customization features to alter their reading experience.

Internal structures
Landmarks in the Wikipedia community, and the development of its organization, internal structures, and policies.
 April 2001, Wales formally defines the "neutral point of view", Wikipedia's core non-negotiable editorial policy, a reformulation of the "Lack of Bias" policy outlined by Sanger for Nupedia in spring or summer 2000, which covered many of the same core principles.
 In February 2002, concerns over the risk of future censorship and commercialization by Bomis Inc (Wikipedia's original host) combined with a lack of guarantee this would not happen, led most participants of the Spanish Wikipedia to break away and establish it independently as the Enciclopedia Libre. Following clarification of Wikipedia's status and non-commercial nature later that year, re-merger talks between Enciclopedia Libre and the re-founded Spanish Wikipedia occasionally took place in 2002 and 2003, but no conclusion was reached. As of October 2009, the two continue to coexist as substantial Spanish language reference sources, with around 43,000 articles (EL) and 520,000 articles (Sp.W) respectively.
 Also in 2002, policy and style issues were clarified with the creation of the Manual of Style, along with a number of other policies and guidelines.
 November 2002 – new mailing lists for WikiEN and Announce are set up, as well as other language mailing lists (e.g. Polish), to reduce the volume of traffic on mailing lists.
 In July 2003, the rule against editing one's autobiography is introduced.
 On 28 October 2003, the first "real" meeting of Wikipedians happened in Munich. Many cities followed suit, and soon a number of regular Wikipedian get-togethers were established around the world. Several Internet communities, including one on the popular blog website LiveJournal, have also sprung up since.
On 27 August 2004 the Community Portal was started, to serve as a focus for community efforts. These were previously accomplished on an informal basis, by individual queries of the Recent Changes, in wiki style, as ad hoc collaborations between like-minded editors.
 During September to December 2005 following the Seigenthaler controversy and other similar concerns, several anti-abuse features and policies were added to Wikipedia. These were:
 The policy for "Checkuser" (a MediaWiki extension to assist detection of abuse via internet sock-puppetry) was established in November 2005. Checkuser function had previously existed but was viewed more as a system tool at the time, so there had been no need for a policy covering use on a more routine basis.
Creation of new pages on the English Wikipedia was restricted to editors who had created a user account.
 The introduction and rapid adoption of the policy Wikipedia:Biographies of living people, giving a far tighter quality control and fact-check system to biographical articles related to living people.
 The "semi-protection" function and policy, allowing pages to be protected so that only those with an account could edit.
 In May 2006, a new "oversight" feature was introduced on the English Wikipedia, allowing a handful of highly trusted users to permanently erase page revisions containing copyright infringements or libelous or personal information from a page's history. Previous to this, page version deletion was laborious, and also deleted versions remained visible to other administrators and could be un-deleted by them.
 On 1 January 2007, the subcommunity named Esperanza was disbanded by communal consent. Esperanza had begun as an effort to promote "wikilove" and a social support network, but had developed its own subculture and private structures. Its disbanding was described as the painful but necessary remedy for a project that had allowed editors to "see themselves as Esperanzans first and foremost". A number of Esperanza's subprojects were integrated back into Wikipedia as free-standing projects, but most of them are now inactive. When the group was founded in September 2005, there had been concerns expressed that it would eventually be condemned as such.
 In April 2007, the results of a 4 month policy review by a working group of several hundred editors seeking to merge the core Wikipedia policies into one core policy (See: Wikipedia:Attribution) were polled for community support. The proposal did not gain consensus; a significant view became evident that the existing structure of three strong focused policies covering the respective areas of policy, was frequently seen as more helpful to quality control than one more general merged proposal.
 A one-day blackout of Wikipedia was called by Jimmy Wales on 18 January 2012, in conjunction with Google and over 7,000 other websites, to protest the Stop Online Piracy Act then under consideration by the United States Congress.

The Wikimedia Foundation and legal structures
Legal and organizational structure of the Wikimedia Foundation, its executive, and its activities as a foundation.
 In August 2002, shortly after Jimmy Wales announced that he would never run commercial advertisements on Wikipedia, the URL of Wikipedia was changed from wikipedia.com to wikipedia.org (see: .com and .org).
 On 20 June 2003, the Wikimedia Foundation was founded.
 Communications committee was formed in January 2006 to handle media inquiries and emails received for the foundation and Wikipedia via the newly implemented OTRS (a ticket handling system).
 Angela Beesley and Florence Nibart-Devouard were elected to the Board of Trustees of the Wikimedia Foundation. During this time, Angela was active in editing content and setting policies, such as privacy policy, within the Foundation.
 On 10 January 2006, Wikipedia became a registered trademark of Wikimedia Foundation.
 In July 2006, Angela Beesley resigned from the board of the Wikimedia Foundation.
 In June 2006, Brad Patrick was hired to be the first executive director of the Foundation. He resigned in January 2007 and was later replaced by Sue Gardner (June 2007).
 In October 2006, Florence Nibart-Devouard became chair of the board of the Wikimedia Foundation.

Projects and milestones

Sister projects and milestones related to articles, user base, and other statistics.
 On 15 January 2001, the first recorded edit of Wikipedia was performed.
 In December 2002, the first sister project, Wiktionary, was created; aiming to produce a dictionary and thesaurus of the words in all languages. It uses the same software as Wikipedia.
 On 22 January 2003, the English Wikipedia was again slashdotted after having reached the 100,000 article milestone with the Hastings, New Zealand, article. Two days later, the German-language Wikipedia, the largest non-English language version, passed the 10,000 article mark.
 On 20 June 2003, the same day that the Wikimedia Foundation was founded, "Wikiquote" was created. A month later, "Wikibooks" was launched. "Wikisource" was set up towards the end of the year.
 In January 2004, Wikipedia reached the 200,000-article milestone in English with the article on Neil Warnock, and reached 450,000 articles for both English and non-English Wikipedias. The next month, the combined article count of the English and non-English reached 500,000.
 On 20 April 2004, the article count of the English Wikipedia reached 250,000.
 On 7 July 2004, the article count of the English Wikipedia reached 300,000.
 On 20 September 2004, Wikipedia's total article count exceeded 1,000,000 articles in over 105 languages; the project received a flurry of related attention in the press. The one millionth article was published in the Hebrew Wikipedia and discusses the flag of Kazakhstan.
 On 20 November 2004, the article count of the English Wikipedia reached 400,000.
 On 18 March 2005, Wikipedia passed the 500,000-article milestone in English, with Involuntary settlements in the Soviet Union being announced in a press release as the landmark article.
 In May 2005, Wikipedia became the most popular reference website on the Internet according to traffic monitoring company Hitwise, relegating Dictionary.com to second place.
 On 29 September 2005, the English Wikipedia passed the 750,000-article mark.
 On 1 March 2006, the English Wikipedia passed the 1,000,000-article mark, with Jordanhill railway station being announced on the Main Page as the milestone article.
 On 8 June 2006, the English Wikipedia passed the 1,000-featured-article mark, with Iranian peoples.
 On 15 August 2006, the Wikimedia Foundation launched Wikiversity.
 On 1 September 2006, Wikipedia exceeded 5,000,000 articles across all 229 language editions.
 On 24 November 2006, the English Wikipedia passed the 1,500,000-article mark, with Kanab ambersnail being announced on the Main Page as the milestone article.
 On 4 April 2007, the first Wikipedia CD selection in English was published as a free download.
 On 22 April 2007, the English Wikipedia passed the 1,750,000-article mark. RAF raid on La Caine HQ was the 1,750,000th article.
 On 9 September 2007, the English Wikipedia passed the 2,000,000-article mark. El Hormiguero was accepted by consensus as the 2,000,000th article.
 On 28 March 2008, Wikipedia exceeded 10 million articles across all 251 language editions.
 On 11 October 2008, the English Wikipedia passed the 2,500,000-article mark. While no attempt was made to officially identify the 2,500,000th article, Joe Connor (baseball) has been suggested as the possible article.
 On 17 August 2009, the English Wikipedia passed the 3,000,000-article mark, with Beate Eriksen being announced on the Main Page as the milestone article.
 On 27 December 2009, the German Wikipedia exceeded 1,000,000 articles, becoming the second Wikipedia language edition to do so.
 On 21 September 2010, the French Wikipedia exceeded 1,000,000 articles, becoming the third Wikipedia language edition to do so.
 On 12 December 2010, the English Wikipedia passed the 3,500,000-article mark.
 On 22 November 2011, Wikipedia exceeded 20 million articles across all 282 language editions.
 On 7 November 2011, the German Wikipedia exceeded 100 million page edits.
 On 24 November 2011, the English Wikipedia exceeded 500 million page edits.
 On 17 December 2011, the Dutch Wikipedia exceeded 1,000,000 articles, becoming the fourth Wikipedia language edition to do so.
 On 13 July 2012, the English Wikipedia exceeded 4,000,000 articles, with Izbat al-Burj.
 On 22 January 2013, the Italian Wikipedia exceeded 1,000,000 articles, becoming the fifth Wikipedia language edition to do so.
 On 11 May 2013, the Russian Wikipedia exceeded 1,000,000 articles, becoming the sixth Wikipedia language edition to do so.
 On 16 May 2013, the Spanish Wikipedia exceeded 1,000,000 articles, becoming the seventh Wikipedia language edition to do so.
 On 15 June 2013, the Swedish Wikipedia exceeded 1,000,000 articles, becoming the eighth Wikipedia language edition to do so.
 On 25 September 2013, the Polish Wikipedia exceeded 1,000,000 articles, becoming the ninth Wikipedia language edition to do so.
 On 21 October 2013, Wikipedia exceeded 30 million articles across all 287 language editions.
 On 17 December 2013, the French Wikipedia exceeded 100,000,000 page edits.
 On 25 April 2014, the English Wikipedia passed the 4,500,000 article mark.
 On 8 June 2014, the Waray Wikipedia exceeded 1,000,000 articles, becoming the tenth Wikipedia language edition to do so.
 On 15 June 2014, the Vietnamese Wikipedia exceeded 1,000,000 articles, becoming the eleventh Wikipedia language edition to do so.
 On 17 July 2014, the Cebuano Wikipedia exceeded 1,000,000 articles, becoming the twelfth Wikipedia language edition to do so.
 On 6 September 2015, the Swedish Wikipedia exceeded 2,000,000 articles, becoming the second Wikipedia language edition to do so.
 On 1 November 2015, the English Wikipedia exceeded 5,000,000 articles, with Persoonia terminalis, and it has over 125,000 editors who have made 1 or more edits in the past 30 days.
 On 1 February 2016, the Japanese Wikipedia exceeded 1,000,000 articles, becoming the thirteenth Wikipedia language edition to do so.
 On 14 February 2016, the Cebuano Wikipedia exceeded 2,000,000 articles, becoming the third Wikipedia language edition to do so.
 On 29 April 2016, the Swedish Wikipedia exceeded 3,000,000 articles, becoming the second Wikipedia language edition to do so.
 On 26 May 2016, Wikipedia exceeded 40 million articles across all 293 language editions.
 On 26 September 2016, the Cebuano Wikipedia exceeded 3,000,000 articles, becoming the third Wikipedia language edition to do so.
 On 19 November 2016, the German Wikipedia exceeded 2,000,000 articles, becoming the fourth Wikipedia language edition to do so.
 On 3 March 2017, the Cebuano Wikipedia exceeded 4,000,000 articles, becoming the second Wikipedia language edition to do so.
 On 6 July 2017, the Spanish Wikipedia exceeded 100,000,000 page edits.
 On 15 September 2017, the Russian Wikipedia exceeded 100,000,000 page edits.
 On 27 October 2017, the English Wikipedia passed the 5,500,000 article mark.
 On 13 April 2018, the Chinese Wikipedia exceeded 1,000,000 articles, becoming the fourteenth Wikipedia language edition to do so.
 On 27 June 2018, the Portuguese Wikipedia exceeded 1,000,000 articles, becoming the fifteenth Wikipedia language edition to do so.
 On 8 July 2018, the French Wikipedia exceeded 2,000,000 articles, becoming the fifth Wikipedia language edition to do so.
 On 14 October 2018, the Arabic Wikipedia exceeded 1,000,000 articles, becoming the sixteenth Wikipedia language edition to do so.
 On 9 March 2019, Wikipedia exceeded 50 million articles across all 309 language editions.
 On 23 January 2020, the English Wikipedia exceeded 6,000,000 articles, with Maria Elise Turner Lauder as the milestone article.
 On 9 March 2020, the Dutch Wikipedia exceeded 2,000,000 articles, becoming the sixth Wikipedia language edition to do so.
 On 23 March 2020, the Ukrainian Wikipedia exceeded 1,000,000 articles, becoming the seventeenth Wikipedia language edition to do so.
 On 1 July 2020, the Egyptian Arabic Wikipedia exceeded 1,000,000 articles, becoming the eighteenth Wikipedia language edition to do so.
 On 25 December 2020, the Bengali Wikipedia exceeded 100,000 articles.
 On 27 November 2022, Wikipedia exceeded 60 million articles across all 319 language editions.

Fundraising

Every year, the Wikimedia Foundation runs fundraising campaigns on Wikipedia to support its operations. These generally last about a month and happen at different times of the year in different countries. In addition to the fundraising banners on Wikipedia itself, there are also email campaigns; some emails invite people to leave the Wikimedia Foundation money in their wills.

Revenue has risen every year of the Wikimedia Foundation's existence, reaching  in 2020/2021, versus expenses of :

In addition, the Wikimedia Endowment, an organizationally separate fundraising effort begun in 2016, reached $100 million in 2021, five years sooner than planned.

External impact
 In 2007, Wikipedia was deemed fit to be used as a major source by the UK Intellectual Property Office in a Formula One trademark case ruling.
 Over time, Wikipedia gained recognition amongst more traditional media as a "key source" for major new events, such as the 2004 Indian Ocean earthquake and related tsunami, the 2008 American Presidential election, and 2007 Virginia Tech shooting. The latter article was accessed 750,000 times in two days, with newspapers published locally to the shootings adding that "Wikipedia has emerged as the clearinghouse for detailed information on the event."
 On 21 February 2007, Noam Cohen of the New York Times reported that some academics were banning the use of Wikipedia as a research tool.
 On 27 February 2007, an article in The Harvard Crimson newspaper reported that some professors at Harvard University included Wikipedia in their syllabi, but that there was a split in their perception of using Wikipedia.
 In July 2013, a large-scale study by four major universities identified the most contested articles on Wikipedia, finding that Israel, Adolf Hitler, and God were more fiercely debated than any other subjects.

Effect of biographical articles
Because Wikipedia biographies are often updated as soon as new information comes to light, they are often used as a reference source on the lives of notable people. This has led to attempts to manipulate and falsify Wikipedia articles for promotional or defamatory purposes (see Controversies). It has also led to novel uses of the biographical material provided. Some notable people's lives are being affected by their Wikipedia biography.
 November 2005: The Seigenthaler controversy occurred when a hoaxer asserted on Wikipedia that journalist John Seigenthaler had been involved in the Kennedy assassination of 1963.
 December 2006: German comedian Atze Schröder sued Arne Klempert, secretary of Wikimedia Deutschland because he did not want his real name published in Wikipedia. Schröder later withdrew his complaint but wanted his attorney's costs to be paid by Klempert. A court decided that the artist had to cover those costs himself.
 16 February 2007: Turkish historian Taner Akçam was briefly detained upon arrival at Montréal–Pierre Elliott Trudeau International Airport because of false information on his Wikipedia biography claiming he was a terrorist.
 November 2008: The German Left Party politician Lutz Heilmann claimed that some remarks in his Wikipedia article caused damage to his reputation. He succeeded in getting a court order to make Wikimedia Deutschland remove a key search portal. The result was a national outpouring of support for Wikipedia, more donations to Wikimedia Deutschland, and a rise in daily pageviews of the Lutz Heilmann article from a few dozen to half a million. Shortly after, Heilmann asked the court to withdraw the court order.
 December 2008: Wikimedia Nederland, the Dutch chapter, won a preliminary injunction after an entrepreneur was linked in "his" article with the criminal Willem Holleeder and wanted the article deleted. The judge in Utrecht believed Wikimedia's assertion that it has no influence on the content of Dutch Wikipedia.
 February 2009: When Karl Theodor Maria Nikolaus Johann Jacob Philipp Franz Joseph Sylvester Buhl-Freiherr von und zu Guttenberg became federal minister on 10 February 2009, an unregistered user added an eleventh given name in the article on German Wikipedia: Wilhelm. Numerous newspapers took it over. When wary Wikipedians wanted to erase Wilhelm, the revert was reverted with regard to those newspapers. This case about Wikipedia reliability and journalists copying from Wikipedia became known as Falscher Wilhelm ("wrong Wilhelm").
 May 2009: An article about the German journalist Richard Herzinger in the German Wikipedia was vandalized. The IP user added that Herzinger, who wrote for Die Welt, was Jewish. The change was cleared for publication by an authorized editor as it did not contain any obvious vandalism. Herzinger complained about the change to Wikipedians who immediately deleted the assertion. According to Herzinger, who wrote about the incident in a newspaper article, he is regularly called a Jew by right-wing extremists due to his perceived pro-Israel stance.
 October 2009: In 1990, the German actor Walter Sedlmayr was murdered. Years later, when the two murderers were released from prison, German law prohibited the media from mentioning their names. The men's lawyer also sent the Wikimedia Foundation a cease and desist letter requesting the men's names be removed from the English Wikipedia.

Early roles of Wales and Sanger

Sanger played an important role in the early stages of creating Wikipedia. Wales says that Sanger was his subordinate employee. Sanger initially brought the wiki concept to Wales and suggested it be applied to Nupedia and then, after some initial skepticism, Wales agreed to try it. It was Jimmy Wales, along with other people, who came up with the broader idea of an open-source, collaborative encyclopedia that would accept contributions from ordinary people and it was Wales who invested in it. Wales stated in October 2001 that "Larry had the idea to use Wiki software." Sanger coined the portmanteau "Wikipedia" as the project name. In review, Larry Sanger conceived of a wiki-based encyclopedia as a strategic solution to Nupedia's inefficiency problems. In terms of project roles, Sanger spearheaded and pursued the project as its leader in its first year, and did most of the early work in formulating policies (including "Ignore all rules" and "Neutral point of view") and building up the community. Upon departure in March 2002, Sanger emphasized the main issue was purely the cessation of Bomis' funding for his role, which was not viable part-time, and his changing personal priorities; however, by 2004, the two had drifted apart and Sanger became more critical. Two weeks after the launch of Citizendium, Sanger criticized Wikipedia, describing the latter as "broken beyond repair." By 2005 Wales began to dispute Sanger's role in the project, three years after Sanger left.

In 2005, Wales described himself simply as the founder of Wikipedia; however, according to Brian Bergstein of the Associated Press, "Sanger has long been cited as a co-founder." There is evidence that Sanger was called co-founder, along with Wales, as early as 2001, and he is referred to as such in early Wikipedia press releases and Wikipedia articles and in a September 2001 New York Times article for which both were interviewed. In 2006, Wales said, "He used to work for me [...] I don't agree with calling him a co-founder, but he likes the title"; nonetheless, before January 2004, Wales did not dispute Sanger's status as co-founder and, indeed, identified himself as "co-founder" as late as August 2002. In Sanger's introductory message to the Nupedia mailing list, he said that Jimmy Wales "contacted me and asked me to apply as editor-in-chief of Nupedia. [...] He had had the idea for Nupedia since at least last fall. He tells me that, when thinking about people (particularly philosophers) he knew who could manage this sort of long-term project, he thought I would be perfect for the job. This is indeed my dream job".

As of March 2007: Wales emphasized this employer–employee relationship and his ultimate authority, terming himself Wikipedia's sole founder; and Sanger emphasized their statuses as co-founders, referencing earlier versions of Wikipedia pages (2004, 2006), press releases (2002–2004), and media coverage from the time of his involvement routinely terming them in this manner.

Controversies

 January 2001: Licensing and structure.  After the partial breakdown of discussions with Bomis, Richard Stallman announced GNUpedia as a competing project. Besides having a nearly identical name, it was very similar functionally to Nupedia/Wikipedia (the former which launched in March 2000 but had as yet published very few articles—the latter of which was intended to be a source of seed-articles for the former). The goals and methods of GNUpedia were nearly identical to Wikipedia: anyone can contribute, small contributions are welcome, plan on taking years, a narrow focus on encyclopedic content as the primary goal, anyone can read articles, anyone can mirror articles, anyone can translate articles, use libre-licensed code to run the site, encourage peer review, and rely primarily on volunteers. GNUpedia was roughly intended to be a combination of Wikipedia and also Wikibooks. The main exceptions were:

 The strong prohibition against *any* sort of centralized control ("[must not be] written under the direction of a single organization, which made all decisions about the content, and... published in a centralized fashion. ...we dare not allow any organization to decide what counts as part of [our encyclopedia]"). In particular, deletionists were not allowed; editing an article would require forking it, making a change, and then saving the result as a 'new' article on the same topic.
 Assuming attribution for articles (rather than anonymous by default), requiring attribution for quotations, and allowing original authors to control straightforward translations, In particular, the idea was to have a set of N articles covering the Tiananmen Square protests of 1989, with some to-be-determined mechanism for readers to endorse/rank/like/plus/star the version of the article they found best.
 Given the structure above, where every topic (especially controversial ones) might have a thousand articles purporting to be *the* GNUpedia article about Sarah Palin, Stallman explicitly rejected the idea of a centralized website that would specify which article of those thousand was worth reading. Instead of an official catalogue, the plan was to rely on search engines at first (the reader would begin by googling "gnupedia sarah palin"), and then eventually if necessary construct catalogues according to the same principles as articles were constructed. In Wikipedia, there is an official central website for each language (en.wikipedia.org), and an official catalogue of sorts (category-lists and lists-of-lists), but  search engines still provide about 60% of the inbound traffic.

The goals which led to GNUpedia were published at least as early as 18 December 2000, and these exact goals were finalized on the 12th and 13th of January 2001, albeit with a copyright of 1999, from when Stallman had first started considering the problem. The only sentence added between 18 December and the unveiling of GNUpedia the week of 12–16 January was this: "The GNU Free Documentation License would be a good license to use for courses."

GNUpedia was "formally" announced on the slashdot website, on 16 January, the same day that their mailing list first went online with a test-message. Wales posted to the list on 17 January, the first full day of messages, explaining the discussions with Stallman concerning the change in Nupedia content licensing, and suggesting cooperation. Stallman himself first posted on 19 January, and, in his second post on 22 January, mentioned that discussions about merging Wikipedia and GNUpedia were ongoing. Within a couple of months, Wales had changed his email signature from the open source encyclopedia to the free encyclopedia; both Nupedia and Wikipedia had adopted the GFDL; and the merger of GNUpedia into Wikipedia was effectively accomplished.
 November 2001: Wales announced that advertising would soon begin on Wikipedia, starting in early or mid-2002. Instead, in early 2002, Chief Editor Larry Sanger was fired, since his salary was the largest expense in the operation of Wikipedia. By September 2002, Wales had publicly stated: "There are currently no plans for advertising on Wikipedia." By June 2003, the Wikimedia Foundation was formally incorporated. The Foundation is explicitly against paid advertising; although, it does "internally" advertise Wikimedia Foundation fundraising events on Wikipedia. , the by-laws of the Wikimedia Foundation do not explicitly prohibit the adoption of a broader advertising policy, if such an action is deemed necessary—such by-laws are subject to vote.
 2003: No notable controversies occurred.
 2004: No notable controversies occurred.
 January 2005: The fake charity QuakeAID, in the month following the 2004 Indian Ocean earthquake, attempted to use a Wikipedia page for promotional purposes.
 October 2005: Alan Mcilwraith was exposed as a fake war hero through a Wikipedia page.
 November 2005: The Seigenthaler controversy caused Brian Chase to resign from his employment, after his identity was ascertained by Daniel Brandt of Wikipedia Watch. Following this, the scientific journal Nature undertook a peer reviewed study to test articles in Wikipedia against their equivalents in Encyclopædia Britannica, and concluded they are comparable in terms of accuracy. Britannica rejected their methodology and their conclusion. Nature refused to release any form of apology, and instead asserted the reliability of its study and a rejection of the criticisms.
 Early-to-mid-2006: The congressional aides biography scandals were publicized, whereby several political aides were caught trying to influence the Wikipedia biographies of several politicians. The aides removed undesirable information (including pejorative quotes, or broken campaign promises), added favorable information or "glowing" tributes, or replaced the article in part or whole by staff-authored biographies. The staff of at least five politicians were implicated: Marty Meehan, Norm Coleman, Conrad Burns, Joe Biden and Gil Gutknecht. The activities documented were:

In a separate but similar incident, the campaign manager for Cathy Cox, Morton Brilliant, resigned after being found to have added negative information to the Wikipedia entries of political opponents. Following media publicity, the incidents tapered off around August 2006.
 July 2006: Joshua Gardner was exposed as a fake Duke of Cleveland with a Wikipedia page.
 January 2007: English-language Wikipedians in Qatar were briefly blocked from editing, following a spate of vandalism, by an administrator who did not realize that the country's internet traffic is routed through a single IP address. Multiple media sources promptly declared that Wikipedia was banning Qatar from the site.
 On 23 January 2007, a Microsoft employee offered to pay Rick Jelliffe to review and change certain Wikipedia articles regarding an open-source document standard which was rival to a Microsoft format.
 In February 2007, The New Yorker magazine issued a rare editorial correction that a prominent English Wikipedia editor and administrator known as "Essjay", had invented a persona using fictitious credentials. The editor, Ryan Jordan, became a Wikia employee in January 2007 and divulged his real name; this was noticed by Daniel Brandt of Wikipedia Watch, and communicated to the original article author. (See: Essjay controversy)
 February 2007: Fuzzy Zoeller sued a Miami firm because defamatory information was added to his Wikipedia biography in an anonymous edit that came from their network.
 16 February 2007: Turkish historian Taner Akçam was briefly detained upon arrival at a Canadian airport because of false information on his biography indicating that he was a terrorist.
 In June 2007, an anonymous user posted hoax information that, by coincidence, foreshadowed the Chris Benoit murder-suicide, hours before the bodies were found by investigators. The discovery of the edit attracted widespread media attention and was first covered in the sister site Wikinews.
 In October 2007, in their obituaries of recently deceased TV theme composer Ronnie Hazlehurst, many British media organisations reported that he had co-written the S Club 7 song "Reach". In fact, he hadn't, and it was discovered that this information had been sourced from a hoax edit to Hazlehurst's Wikipedia article.
 In February 2007, Barbara Bauer, a literary agent, sued Wikimedia for defamation and causing harm to her business, the Barbara Bauer Literary Agency. In Bauer v. Glatzer, Bauer claimed that information on Wikipedia critical of her abilities as a literary agent caused this harm. The Electronic Frontier Foundation defended Wikipedia and moved to dismiss the case on 1 May 2008. The case against the Wikimedia Foundation was dismissed on 1 July 2008.
 On 14 July 2009, the National Portrait Gallery issued a cease-and-desist letter for alleged breach of copyright, against a Wikipedia editor who downloaded more than 3,000 high-resolution images from the NPG website, and placed them on Wikimedia Commons. See National Portrait Gallery and Wikimedia Foundation copyright dispute for more.
 In April and May 2010, there was controversy over the hosting and display of sexual drawing and pornographic images including images of children on Wikipedia. It led to the mass removal of pornographic content from Wikimedia Foundation sites.
 In November 2012, Lord Justice Leveson wrote in his report on British press standards, "The Independent was founded in 1986 by the journalists Andreas Whittam Smith, Stephen Glover and Brett Straub..." He had used the Wikipedia article for The Independent newspaper as his source, but an act of vandalism had replaced Matthew Symonds (a genuine co-founder) with Brett Straub (an unknown character). The Economist said of the Leveson report, "Parts of it are a scissors-and-paste job culled from Wikipedia."
 In late 2013, commentators publicly shared observations of the reappearance of many of the pornographic images deleted from Wikipedia since 2010.

Notable forks and derivatives 
Other sites also use the MediaWiki software and concept, popularized by Wikipedia. No list of them is maintained.

Specialized foreign language forks using the Wikipedia concept include Enciclopedia Libre (Spanish), Wikiweise (German), WikiZnanie (Russian), Susning.nu (Swedish), and Baidu Baike (Chinese). Some of these (such as Enciclopedia Libre) use GFDL or compatible licenses as used by Wikipedia, leading to the exchange of material with their respective language Wikipedias.

In 2006, Larry Sanger founded Citizendium, based upon a modified version of MediaWiki. The site said it aimed 'to improve on the Wikipedia model with "gentle expert oversight", among other things'. (See also Nupedia).

Publication on other media
The German Wikipedia was the first to be partly published also using other media (rather than online on the internet), including releases on CD in November 2004 and more extended versions on CDs or DVD in April 2005 and December 2006. In December 2005, the publisher Zenodot Verlagsgesellschaft mbH, a sister company of Directmedia, published a 139-page book explaining Wikipedia, its history and policies, which was accompanied by a 7.5 GB DVD containing 300,000 articles and 100,000 images from the German Wikipedia. Originally, Directmedia also announced plans to print the German Wikipedia in its entirety, in 100 volumes of 800 pages each. The publication was due to begin in October 2006, and finish in 2010. In March 2006, however, this project was called off.

In September 2008, Bertelsmann published a 1000 pages volume with a selection of popular German Wikipedia articles. Bertelsmann paid voluntarily 1 Euro per sold copy to Wikimedia Deutschland.

A free software project has also been launched to make a static version of English Wikipedia available for use on iPods. The "Encyclopodia" project was started around March 2006 and can currently be used on 1st to 4th-generation iPods.

English Wikipedia CD/DVD/Kiwix ZIM file releases 

As of June 2022, there have been no more article selection releases since Wikipedia Version 0.8.

Lawsuits
In limited ways, the Wikimedia Foundation is protected by Section 230 of the Communications Decency Act. In the defamation action Bauer et al. v. Glatzer et al., it was held that Wikimedia had no case to answer because of this section. A similar law in France caused a lawsuit to be dismissed in October 2007. In 2013, a German appeals court (the Higher Regional Court of Stuttgart) ruled that Wikipedia is a "service provider" not a "content provider", and as such is immune from liability as long as it takes down content that is accused of being illegal.

See also

 History of wikis
 Predictions of the end of Wikipedia
 The Wikipedia Revolution, 2009 book by Andrew Lih

Notes

References

External links

Wikipedia records and archives

Wikipedia's project files contain a large quantity of reference and archive material. Useful internal resources on Wikipedia history include:

Historical summaries
 :Category:Wikipedia years – historical events by year
 History of Wikipedia – from the Wikipedia:Meta
 meta:Wikimedia News – news and milestones index from all Wikipedias
 Wikipedia:BrilliantProse – predecessor of Wikipedia:Featured articles and Wikipedia:Good articles
 Wikipedia:Historic debates
 Wikipedia:History of Wikipedia bots
 Wikipedia:Wikipedia records
 Wikipedia:Wikipedia's oldest articles

Milestones, size and statistics
 Stats.wikimedia.org – the Wikimedia Foundation's main interface for all project statistics, including the various and combined Wikipedia's.
 Wikipedia milestones
 Wikipedia:Milestones (inactive)
 Wikipedia:Size of Wikipedia
 Wikipedia:Statistics

Discussion and debate archives
 Wikipedia:Announcement archive
 Wikipedia:Mailing lists

Other
  Larry Sanger on the origins of Wikipedia
 MediaWiki history
 Nostalgia Wikipedia – a snapshot of Wikipedia from 20 December 2001, running a later version of MediaWiki for security reasons but using a skin that looks like the software of the time
 Wikipedia:CamelCase and Wikipedia
 Wikipedia:Magnus Manske Day – MediaWiki software goes live into production
 Wikipedia:Volunteer Fire Department – handling of major editorial influx. Disbanded when no longer needed (2004)
 ZIM File Archive, at Internet Archive, contains full Wikipedia snapshots (as well as articles selections) in multiple languages, from different years. Files can be open with Kiwix software.

Third party
 "Fatally Flawed: Refuting the recent study on encyclopedic accuracy by the journal Nature". Encyclopædia Britannica. March 2006.
 Early Wikipedia snapshot via Internet Archive. 28 February 2001.
 Giles, Jim, "Internet encyclopaedias go head to head". Nature comparison between Wikipedia and Britannica. 14 December 2005 
 Larry Sanger. "The Early History of Nupedia and Wikipedia: A Memoir" and "Part II". Slashdot. 18 April 2005 – 19 April 2005.
 Nature's responses to Encyclopædia Britannica. Nature. 23 March 2006. 
 New York Times on Wikipedia. September 2001.
 The Free Universal Encyclopedia and Learning Resource – Free Software Foundation endorsement of Nupedia (later updated to include Wikipedia). 1999.

 
Articles containing video clips
Wikipedia
Encyclopedism
Jimmy Wales